Tyler Steven Axness (born 1987) is an American talk radio host and former politician. A member of the North Dakota Democratic–Nonpartisan League Party, he served in the North Dakota Senate for the 16th district from 2013 to 2016.

Politics and early career 
Axness was a North Dakota Democratic-NPL State Senator who represented North Dakota's 16th legislative district in the North Dakota Senate from 2013 to 2016. Axness had previously served as the communication and policy coordinator of the Freedom Resource Center.

Radio 
Axness hosts Afternoons Live with Tyler Axness on KFGO radio. The show airs for three hours on weekday afternoons.

NDxPlains.com 
Axness is the creator of and writer for NDxPlains.com, a politically-focused news website and social media platform that covers issues and events that affect North Dakota on a statewide and national scale.

References

External links

Afternoons Live with Tyler Axness KFGO radio program 
North Dakota Legislature biography

1987 births
Democratic Party North Dakota state senators
Living people
21st-century American politicians
North Dakota State University alumni
People from Fargo, North Dakota